The 2014–15 season of F.B.C. Unione Venezia's is their first season in the new Lega Pro format.

The club will plays in the Girone A north Italy.

Squad

Left in January window

Staff
Head coach
  Alessandro Dal Canto
Assistant coach
  Vincenzo Italiano

Coppa Italia

Lega Pro

References

External links

Venezia
Venezia F.C. seasons